ACS Cycling Chirio–Casa Giani (UCI Code: CHI) is a professional cycling team based in Montechiaro d'Asti in Italy. It competes in road bicycle racing events, including in some UCI Women's Road World Cup events.

Team history
On October 17, 2014, Daiva Tušlaitė left the team to join ASD Giusfredi Ciclismo. On November 19, Rossella Callovi left the team to join Top Girls Fassa Bortolo. On December 2 Íngrid Drexel and Jessenia Meneses left the team to join Astana–Acca Due O.

Major wins

2002
GP Carnevale d'Europa (F):  Zoulfia Zabirova
Chrono Champenois — Trophée Européen (F):  Zoulfia Zabirova
Stage 2 Giro della Toscana Int. Femminile (F):  Zinaida Stahurskaya
Stage 4 Giro della Toscana Int. Femminile (F):  Zoulfia Zabirova
2003
Stage 1 Vuelta Castilla y Leon (F):  Regina Schleicher
Trofeo Riviera Della Versilia (F):  Zinaida Stahurskaya
GP Carnevale d'Europa (F):  Regina Schleicher
2004
Stage 4 Emakumeen Euskal Bira (F):  Jolanta Polikevičiūtė
Stage 3 Trophée d'Or Féminin (F):  Clemilda Fernandes Silva
2005
Giro del Lago Maggiore — GP Knorr (F):  Giorgia Bronzini
Giro del Friuli Donne (F):  Giorgia Bronzini
Stages 1 & 3 Giro del Trentino Alto Adige — Südtirol (F):  Giorgia Bronzini
Stages 3, 6 & 9 Giro d'Italia Donne (F):  Giorgia Bronzini
Rund um die Nürnberger Altstadt (F):  Giorgia Bronzini
Stage 3 part a Giro della Toscana Int. Femminile (F):  Giorgia Bronzini
Stage 3 part b Giro della Toscana Int. Femminile (F):  Clemilda Fernandes Silva
Chrono Champenois — Trophée Européen (F):  Kathryn (Kathy) Watt
Stage 5 Giro della Toscana Int. Femminile (F):  Giorgia Bronzini
2006
Copa América de Ciclismo (F):  Clemilda Fernandes Silva
Sydney, Points race (F):  Vera Carrara
Stage 5 Holland Ladies Tour (F):  Vera Carrara
2007
Stage 1 Vuelta Ciclista Femenina a el Salvador (F): Tetyana Styazhkina
Vuelta a El Salvador Stage 3b – Uênia Fernandes
Vuelta al Quindío (F):  Laura Camila Lozano Ramirez
Copa América de Ciclismo (F):  Clemilda Fernandes Silva
GP De Santa Ana (F): Tetyana Styazhkina
 GP Rund um Visp (F):  Min Hye Lee
Giro del Valdarno (F):  Clemilda Fernandes Silva
2008
Copa América de Ciclismo, Uênia Fernandes de Souza
 Lyon Vaise, Jolanta Polikevičiūtė
 Pélussin, Alyona Andruk
 Overall Vuelta a El Salvador, Tetyana Styazhkina
Stage 3, Janildes Fernandes
Stage 4, Tetyana Styazhkina
Lyon Gerland, Urtė Juodvalkytė
Reyrieux, Evelyn García
Stage 6 Grande Boucle, Rasa Polikevičiūtė
Stage 4 Route de France Féminine, Urtė Juodvalkytė

2009
Copa América de Ciclismo, Janildes Fernandes Silva

2011
GP Liberazione, Giorgia Bronzini
Liberty Classic, Giorgia Bronzini
Grand Prix Cycliste de Gatineau, Giorgia Bronzini

2013
Stages 3 & 7 Vuelta a El Salvador, Clemilda Fernandes Silva
Stage 6 Vuelta a El Salvador, Uênia Fernandes de Souza
Grand Prix GSB, Clemilda Fernandes Silva
Tour of Chongming Island World Cup, Tetyana Ryabchenko

National, continental and world champions

2002
 Russia Time Trial, Zoulfia Zabirova
2005
 European U23 Track, (Pursuit), Tatsiana Sharakova
 Brazil Road Race, Clemilda Fernandes Silva
 Belarus Road Race, Tatsiana Sharakova
 Japan Road Race, Miho Oki
2006
 Italy Cyclo-cross, Annabella Stropparo
 Argentina Road Race,  Valeria Romina Pintos
 World Track (Points race), Vera Carrara
 European U23 Track,  Tatsiana Sharakova
2007
 Pan American Track (Team Sprint), Karelia Judith Machado Jaimes
 Brazil Time Trial, Janildes Fernandes Silva
 Czech National Time Trial, Tereza Huřiková
2008
 Brazil Road Race, Clemilda Fernandes Silva
 Ukraine Time Trial, Tetyana Styazhkina
 Ukraine Road, Tetyana Styazhkina
2009
 Brazil Road Race, Clemilda Fernandes Silva
2010
 Brazil Road Race, Janildes Fernandes Silva
2011
 World Road Race, Giorgia Bronzini
 New Zealand Road Race, Catherine Cheatley
2012
 Brazil Time Trial, Uênia Fernandes de Souza
 Lithuania Road Race, Svetlana Pauliukaitė
2013
 Brazil Time Trial, Clemilda Fernandes Silva
2014
 Lithuania Road Race, Edita Janeliūnaitė
 Lithuania Time Trial, Daiva Tušlaitė
 Belarus Road Race, Elenka Sitsko
2015
 Colombia Road Race, Leidy Natalia Muñoz
 Estonia Road Race, Liisa Ehrberg

Previous team rosters

2011

Ages as of 1 January 2011.

2009

2008

External links
Official website
Old official website (up to 2010)

UCI Women's Teams
Cycling teams based in Italy
Cycling teams established in 2001
Montechiaro d'Asti